This is a list of casinos in California.

List of casinos

See also

List of casinos in the United States
 Gambling in California
List of casino hotels

Notes

References

Casinos in California
California Gambling Control Commission list of cardrooms

 
Casinos
California